King Township is a township in Bedford County, Pennsylvania, United States. The population was 1,176 at the 2020 census.

Geography
King Township is located in northern Bedford County.

Demographics

As of the census of 2010, there were 1,238 people, 491 households, and 365 families residing in the township.  The population density was 81.8 people per square mile (31.6/km2).  There were 531 housing units at an average density of 33.3/sq mi (12.8/km2).  The racial makeup of the township was 99.7% White, 0.04% African American, 0.00% Native American, 0.0% from other races, and 0.3 from two or more races. Hispanic or Latino of any race were 0.3 of the population.

There were 472 households, out of which 35.0% had children under the age of 18 living with them, 64.0% were married couples living together, 8.1% had a female householder with no husband present, and 23.9% were non-families. 20.6% of all households were made up of individuals, and 10.8% had someone living alone who was 65 years of age or older.  The average household size was 2.68 and the average family size was 3.08.

In the township the population was spread out, with 25.2% under the age of 18, 8.7% from 18 to 24, 28.3% from 25 to 44, 24.1% from 45 to 64, and 13.6% who were 65 years of age or older.  The median age was 37 years. For every 100 females there were 97.5 males.  For every 100 females age 18 and over, there were 97.7 males.

The median income for a household in the township was $34,464, and the median income for a family was $38,295. Males had a median income of $28,295 versus $21,607 for females. The per capita income for the township was $15,102.  About 10.0% of families and 12.4% of the population were below the poverty line, including 18.0% of those under age 18 and 17.2% of those age 65 or over.

References

Populated places established in 1760
Townships in Bedford County, Pennsylvania